Kendis may refer to the following notable people:
Given name
Kendis Gibson (born 1972), American journalist
Kendis Moore (born 1948), American swimmer

Surname
J. D. Kendis (1886–1957), American film producer
Sonny Kendis (1911–1974), American pianist, the star of The Sonny Kendis Show
William Kendis (1916–1980), American actor

See also
Kendi (name)